Projekt Herz (English: Project Heart)  is the first EP by German deathcore band, We Butter the Bread with Butter. It was released December 19, 2012 independently. It is also the band's first release to feature Paul Bartzsch on vocals.

On Facebook, the band posted a comment on November 18, 2012 with a picture of their new album cover for "Projekt Herz" saying "It all begins Thursday".

Track listing

Personnel
We Butter the Bread with Butter
 Marcel "Marci" Neumann – lead guitar, programming
 Maximilian Pauly Saux – bass guitar
 Can Özgünsür – drums, programming
 Paul "Борщ" Bartzsch - vocals

References

2012 EPs
German-language EPs
We Butter the Bread with Butter albums